Nelson House is a designated place in northern Manitoba, Canada adjacent to the Nelson House 170 Indian Reserve, which is part of the Nisichawayasihk Cree Nation. Missionaries built the first school in the early 1900s.

Demographics 

References 

Designated places in Manitoba
Northern communities in Manitoba
Unincorporated communities in Northern Region, Manitoba